This is a list of notable Indian film critics
Deeksha Sharma (Filmi Indian)
Anna M. M. Vetticad
Anupama Chopra
Baradwaj Rangan (The New Indian Express, The Hindu)
Bikas Mishra
Chidananda Dasgupta
C. S. Venkiteswaran (The Hindu)
Derek Bose
K. N. T. Sastry
Komal Nahta
Kozhikodan (Mathrubhumi, Chandrika)
Madhu Eravankara
Mathures Paul (The Statesman)
Mayank Shekhar
Namrata Joshi (Outlook) 
Nikhat Kazmi (The Times of India)
Premendra Mazumder
Rajeev Masand (CNN-IBN)
Randor Guy, The Hindu
R. K. Bidur Singh
Sanjit Narwekar
Shubhra Gupta
Subhash K. Jha
Sucharita Tyagi
Taran Adarsh
Utpal Datta 
Vasiraju Prakasam
Vijayakrishnan
Vinayak Chakravorty
V. K. Joseph
Ziya Us Salam

See also
 National Film Award for Best Film Critic

References 

 
Film critics